A - B - C - D - E - F - G - H - I - J - K - L - M - N - O - P - Q - R - S - T - U - V - W - XYZ

This is a list of rivers in the United States that have names starting with the letter N.  For the main page, which includes links to listings by state, see List of rivers in the United States.

Na 
Nabesna River - Alaska
Naches River - Washington
Nacimiento River - California
Naknek River - Alaska
Namekagon River - Wisconsin
Nansemond River - Virginia
Nantahala River - North Carolina
Nanticoke River - Delaware, Maryland
Napa River - California
Narraguagus River - Maine
Nash Stream - New Hampshire
Nashua River - Massachusetts, New Hampshire
Nasketucket River - Massachusetts
Natalbany River - Louisiana 
Natchaug River - Connecticut
Naugatuck River - Connecticut
Navarro River - California
Navasota River - Texas
Navesink River - New Jersey
Navidad River - Texas

Ne 
Necanicum River - Oregon
Neches River - Texas
Negukthlik River - Alaska
Nehalem River - Oregon
Nemadji River - Wisconsin
Nemasket River - Massachusetts
Nenana River - Alaska
Neosho River - Kansas, Oklahoma
Nepaug River - Connecticut
Neponset River - Massachusetts
Nescopeck Creek - Pennsylvania
Neshaminy Creek - Pennsylvania
Neshanic River - New Jersey
Neshota River - Wisconsin
Nespelem River - Washington
Nestucca River - Oregon
Neuse River - North Carolina
Neversink River - New York
New Creek - West Virginia
New River - Northern California
New River - Southern California
New River - Florida
New River - Louisiana
New River - New Hampshire
New River - Southeastern North Carolina
New River - Oregon
New River - Tennessee
New River - western North Carolina, Virginia, West Virginia
Newaukum River - Washington
Newfound River - New Hampshire
Newfound River - Virginia
Newhalen River - Alaska
Newport River - North Carolina

Ni 
Ni River - Virginia
Niagara River - New York
Niangua River - Missouri
Niantic River - Connecticut 
Nigu River - Alaska
Nimishillen Creek - Ohio
Ningaluk River - Alaska
Ninglikfak River - Alaska
Ninilchik River - Alaska
Ninnescah River - Kansas
Niobrara River - Wyoming, Nebraska
Nipmuc River - Rhode Island
Nishnabotna River - Iowa, Missouri
Nisqually River - Washington
Nissequogue River - New York
Nissitissit River - New Hampshire, Massachusetts

No 
Noatak River - Alaska
Nodaway River - Iowa, Missouri
Nokasippi River - Minnesota
Nolichucky River - North Carolina, Tennessee
Nolin River - Kentucky
Nonesuch River - Maine
Nooksack River - Washington
Noonday Creek - Georgia
Nooseneck River - Rhode Island
North River - Alabama
North River - Georgia, Darien River channel
North River - Georgia, St. Marys River tributary
North River - Iowa
North River - Massachusetts, Deerfield River tributary
North River - Massachusetts, Massachusetts Bay tributary
North River - Minnesota
North River - Missouri
North River - New Hampshire
North River - New Jersey, New York
North River - North Carolina
North River - Tennessee
North River - Virginia
North River - Washington
North River - West Virginia
North Anna River - Virginia
North Branch River - New Hampshire
North Branch Contoocook River - New Hampshire
North Branch Metedeconk River - New Jersey
North Branch Millers River - New Hampshire
North Branch Pawtuxet River - Rhode Island
North Branch Potomac River - Maryland, West Virginia
North Branch Raritan River - New Jersey
North Branch Sugar River - New Hampshire
North Branch Upper Ammonoosuc River - New Hampshire
North Branch Westfield River - Massachusetts
North Canadian River - New Mexico, Texas, Oklahoma
North Concho River - Texas
North East River - Maryland
North Fork River - Missouri, Arkansas
North Fork Cache la Poudre River - Colorado
North Fork Embarras River - Illinois
North Fork Feather River - California
North Fork Grand River - North and South Dakota
North Fork Gunnison River - Colorado
North Fork Humboldt River - Nevada
North Fork John Day River - Oregon
North Fork Kentucky River - Kentucky
North Fork Koyukuk River - Alaska
North Fork Middle Fork Willamette River - Oregon
North Fork Musselshell River - Montana
North Fork New River - North Carolina
North Fork Republican River - Colorado, Nebraska
North Fork Shenandoah River - Virginia
North Fork South Branch Potomac River - West Virginia
North Fork South Platte River - Colorado
North Fork Toutle River - Washington
North Laramie River - Wyoming
North Platte River - Colorado, Wyoming, Nebraska
North Santiam River - Oregon
North Umpqua River - Oregon
North Yamhill River - Oregon
Northeast Cape Fear River - North Carolina
Northkill Creek - Pennsylvania
Norwalk River - Connecticut
Nottely River - Georgia, North Carolina
Nottoway River - Virginia, North Carolina
Nowitna River - Alaska
Noxubee River - Mississippi, Alabama
Noyo River - California

Nu 
Nubanusit Brook - New Hampshire
Nueces River - Texas
Nugnugaluktuk River - Alaska
Nushagak River - Alaska
Nuyakuk River - Alaska

N